Khai yat sai or kai yat sai is a type of Thai omelette. The name means 'stuffed eggs'. The egg is cooked lightly, topped with various ingredients (such as minced beef or pork, peas, onion, spring onion, carrots, tomatoes), seasoned with fish sauce and/or oyster sauce, and then folded over.

See also
 List of stuffed dishes

References

Thai cuisine
Omelettes
Stuffed dishes